Denmark–Finland relations are foreign relations between Denmark and Finland. Denmark has an embassy in Helsinki. Finland has an embassy in Copenhagen. Both countries are part of the Nordic Council. Denmark officially recognized Finland's independence in 1918 and diplomatic relations were established on 18 February of that year. Both countries are members of the European Union, Nordic Union, Council of the Baltic Sea States. The Nordic Culture Fund and the Finnish-Danish Cultural Fund support projects of artists in both countries.

History

Denmark was the first country along with Sweden to recognize Finland's independence on 10 January 1918. During Winter War, over 1,000 Danish volunteers came to help Finland. During the Winter war and the Continuation war, Denmark took 4,200 Finnish war children.

Trade
Denmark is Finland's 15th largest export country and the 10th biggest import-trading partner. Finland's exports to Denmark, as well as imports from that area have fluctuated each year, the trade balance, however, was in the 2000s, Finland deficit. In 2008, Finland's exports to Denmark increased. The value of exports to Denmark, was 1.380 billion euros and imports from Denmark was 1.453 billion euros.

Tourism

In 2017, 113,000 Danes visited Finland, while 206,000 Finns visited Denmark.

High-level visits
Former prime minister of Finland Matti Vanhanen visited Denmark on 12 October 2007. Lars Løkke Rasmussen, the Prime Minister of Denmark visited Finland on 10 February 2010 during the Baltic Sea summit.

Diplomacy

Kingdom of Denmark
Helsinki (Embassy) 

Republic of Finland
Copenhagen (Embassy)

See also
Foreign relations of Denmark
Foreign relations of Finland
Kalmar Union
Denmark in the European Union

References

External links
 Historisk blik på relationerne mellem Finland og Danmark 
 Bilateral relations between Denmark and Finland 

 
Finland
Bilateral relations of Finland